Joe or Joseph Doyle may refer to:
Joe Doyle (politician) (1936–2009), Irish Fine Gael politician
Joe Doyle (artist) (born 1941), American artist
Joe Doyle (musician) (born 1977), Irish musician
Joe Doyle (rugby league) (1884–?), English rugby league footballer
Joe Doyle (cyclist) (1933–2012), Irish road racing cyclist and cycle sport administrator
Joseph Doyle (baseball), part of the original ownership team of what became the Brooklyn Dodgers
Joseph Doyle (economist), health economist and Erwin H. Schell Professor of Management and Applied Economics at the MIT Sloan School of Management
Joseph Doyle (pioneer) (1817–1864), trapper, trader, lawyer, legislator and founder of Doyle Settlement
Joseph A. Doyle (1920–2014), U.S. Assistant Secretary of the Navy (Manpower and Reserve Affairs) 1979–1981
Joseph T. Doyle (1931–2012), Pennsylvania politician
Slow Joe Doyle (1881–1947), pitcher for the New York Highlanders and Cincinnati Reds from 1906 to 1910
Joseph O. Doyle, Coast Guard radioman and namesake of USCGC Joseph Doyle, a USCG Sentinel-class cutter